Dickson Beattie "Doc" Hendley (born March 19, 1979) is the founder of Wine to Water, an American charitable organization devoted to providing clean water and sanitation to people around the world.

Biography
Hendley was born to Jeff and Libbi Hendley. He is the second of four children, with one older sister and two younger brothers.  Doc currently resides in Boone, North Carolina with his wife Amber and 2 sons.  Amber is well known in the Boone area for the Clogging studio she owns and operates in downtown Boone.  Doc and Amber are expecting their first daughter in October 2014.

After graduating from Gans High School in [Gans, Oklahoma] in 1997, he later received a bachelor's degree in Communications from North Carolina State University in 2004.

Wine to Water
Hendley is the founder and current president of Wine to Water, a 501 (c)(3) non-profit aid organization focused on providing clean water to needy people around the world. Wine to Water has worked in Sudan, India, Cambodia, Uganda, Ethiopia, Peru, South Africa, and Kenya. The organization responded to the 2010 Haiti earthquake by bringing a water purification system to be implemented within disaster areas.

Hendley first envisioned the concept of Wine to Water in 2003 while bartending and playing music in nightclubs around Raleigh, North Carolina. In January 2004, the first fundraiser was held at a local bar in Raleigh. With the money raised during the event, Hendley traveled to Darfur, Sudan, and began installing water systems for victims of government-supported genocide. He then lived in Sudan for about a year. Upon his return to the United States, he began to focus his energy on developing Wine to Water programs in other countries and received local and national media attention as a result.

CNN Heroes Selection
In May 2009, Hendley was selected as one of the CNN Heroes of the 2009 year out of nearly 9,000 submissions.  In October 2009, a panel of judges — including Gen. Colin Powell, Whoopi Goldberg, Ted Turner, and Elton John — announced that Hendley was a "Top 10 Finalist for CNN’s Hero of Year."
In 2009, Wine to Water had implemented sustainable drinking water initiatives in half a dozen countries and over 25,000 individuals, by 2014 those numbers have rocketed to 18 countries and over 300,000 people.

Book
Hendley published his first book in 2012 titled "Wine to Water; A Bartender's Quest to Bring Clean Water to the World."  The book has received very positive reviews, and has been picked up by several universities as required reading.  The book was left a little "open ended" so a follow-up is expected.

The following quote was taken from the book jacket:

Speaking

Doc does public speaking engagements across the United States and has spoken at several international venues including South Africa, Spain, Turkey and several others.  Doc gives talks to a wide range of venues including non-profits, global conferences, corporate retreats and universities.  He also appeared on the TedX Stage in Asheboro in 2010.

References

External links
winetowater.org
cnn.com
highcountrypress.com
news-record.com
tonic.com
takepart.com

Living people
1979 births
People from Augusta, Georgia
People from Boone, North Carolina